Kaka (O'odham: Gagka, translates as "A Clearing") is a census-designated place (CDP) in Maricopa County, Arizona, United States, located in the Tohono O'odham Nation. The population was 83 at the 2020 census, down from 141 at the 2010 census.

Toponymy
It has frequently been noted on lists of unusual place names.

Geography 
Kaka is in southernmost Maricopa County, nearly touching the border with Pima County.

Demographics 
At the 2020 census there were 83 people and 28 households living in the CDP.

The median household income was $39,573. The per capita income for the CDP was $13,965.

As of the census of 2010, there were 141 people living in the CDP. The population density was 545.0 people per square mile. The racial makeup of the CDP was 99% Native American and 1% from some other race. 6% of the population were Hispanic or Latino of any race.

References

Census-designated places in Maricopa County, Arizona
Tohono O'odham Nation